This is a list of schools in Ho Chi Minh City.

Public schools

Public high schools (limited list) 

VNUHCM High School for the Gifted
Lê Hồng Phong High School for the Gifted
Trần Đại Nghĩa High School for the Gifted 
Nguyễn Thượng Hiền High School 
Nguyễn Thị Minh Khai High School 
Bùi Thị Xuân High School
Phú Nhuận High School
Bình Phú High School

Mạc Đĩnh Chi High School

Nguyễn Du Secondary School
Nguyễn Hữu Cầu High School
Nguyễn Hữu Huân High School
Marie Curie High School 
Võ Thị Sáu High School 
Võ Trường Toản High School
Hùng Vương High School
Chu Văn An High School
Trưng Vương High School
Lương Thế Vinh High School
Trần Khai Nguyên High School
Ten Lơ Man High School
Nguyễn Trãi High School
Nguyễn Khuyến High School
Nguyễn Du High School
Nguyễn Công Trứ High School
TRần Hưng Đạo High School
Nguyễn Chí Thanh High School
Nguyễn Thái Bình High School
Thủ Đức High School
Nguyễn Thị Diệu High School
Ernst Thalmann High School (Trường THPT Ernst Thalmann)

Private schools

Private primary and secondary K-12/K-13 schools (limited list) 
 American International School, Saigon
 APU International School
 Australian International School, Vietnam
British International School Ho Chi Minh City
 British Vietnamese International School - Ho Chi Minh City
 Canadian International School Vietnam
 European International School Ho Chi Minh City
 International German School Ho Chi Minh City
International School Ho Chi Minh City 
 Korean International School, HCMC
 Lycée Français International Marguerite Duras
Saigon South International School
 Taipei School in Ho Chi Minh City

Private junior-senior high schools 
 International School Ho Chi Minh City - American Academy

Private high schools (limited list) 
Ngô Thời Nhiệm High School
Nguyễn Khuyến High School
Khai Trí High School
Quang Trung Nguyễn Huệ High School
Trí Đức High School
Trương Vĩnh Ký High School
VinSchool
VStar School
Australian International School
Western Australian International School Systems
The Canadian International School
Hong Ha Secondary-High School

Private elementary-junior high schools (limited list) 
Japanese School in Ho Chi Minh City

References

See also
 List of universities in Ho Chi Minh City
Lists of schools
Schools in Ho Chi Minh City